"Let's Stay Together" was the second single released from Lyfe Jennings' second album The Phoenix. It peaked at #32 on the Billboard Hot R&B/Hip-Hop Songs chart in February 2007. Jennings has performed both his own "Let’s Stay Together" and Al Green's classic of the same name together in concert.

Charts

References

2006 singles
Lyfe Jennings songs
2006 songs
Columbia Records singles
Songs written by Lyfe Jennings